Julia (Jules) Marino (born September 11, 1997) is an American snowboarder from  Westport, Connecticut who competes in the Slopestyle and Big Air disciplines.

As a rookie, in the 2017 X Games at Aspen's Buttermilk Mountain, she won gold in Slopestyle and a bronze in Big Air, the first female snowboard athlete to win two medals at the same Games in 17 years. On her gold medal run, she became the first female to land a Cab 900 double underflip in an X Games women's Slopestyle contest. She followed this up at the X Games in Hafjell, Norway with a silver in Big Air and a bronze in Slopestyle, for a total of four X Games medals in her rookie year.

In all, Marino had eight podiums in international and elite events during the 2017-18 competition season.

Marino competed in the 2022 Beijing Olympics, winning silver in the women's snowboard slopestyle.

See also
 Winter X Games XXI

References

External links
 
 
 
 
 

Living people
1997 births
American female snowboarders
People from Westport, Connecticut
Sportspeople from Fairfield County, Connecticut
21st-century American women
Snowboarders at the 2018 Winter Olympics
Snowboarders at the 2022 Winter Olympics
Medalists at the 2022 Winter Olympics
Olympic silver medalists for the United States in snowboarding